Mary O'Leary is an American television producer. She currently resides in the neighborhoods of West Hollywood, California.

Credits
 The Young and the Restless - Producer (September 2012 – August 2016) 
 Hollywood Heights - Coordinating Producer (April–August 2012)
 General Hospital - Producer (January 2001 – March 2012)
 One Life to Live - Producer (September 1997 – December 2000)
 Another World - Coordinating Producer (July 1995 – September 1996)
 Guiding Light - Associate Producer (March 1993 – June 1995)

Awards
She won the Daytime Emmy Award for Outstanding Drama Series for her work on The Young and The Restless in 2012, 2013 and 2014 and General Hospital in 2004, 2007 and 2011. She also won the Outstanding Class Special Class Daytime Emmy for The Jeanne Cooper Tribute in 2013.

References

External links
 

American television producers
American women television producers
Daytime Emmy Award winners
Living people
Soap opera producers
American soap opera writers
American women television writers
Year of birth missing (living people)
Women soap opera writers